Lü Debin (Chinese: 吕德彬; May 1953 – 17 October 2005) was a Chinese politician and academic. He was executed in 2005 for murdering his wife.

References 

1953 births
2005 deaths
Chinese murderers
Executed Chinese people
People executed by China by lethal injection
Politicians from Henan
Chinese agronomists
Kansas State University alumni
Henan Agricultural University alumni
Academic staff of Henan Agricultural University
Members of the China Democratic League
20th-century agronomists